Bahawalnagar is a city in Punjab, Pakistan.

Bahawalnagar may also refer to:

Bahawalnagar District, a district situated in Punjab.
Bahawalnagar Tehsil, an administration unit of Bahawalnagar district.
Bahawalnagar Junction railway station, a railway station in Punjab.

See also
Bahawalnagar-Fort Abbas Branch Line, one of the branch line in Pakistan.